The 2006 Grand Valley State Lakers football team was an American football team that won the 2006 NCAA Division II national championship.

The team represented Grand Valley State University in the Great Lakes Intercollegiate Athletic Conference (GLIAC) during the 2006 NCAA Division II football season. In their third season under head coach Chuck Martin, the Lakers compiled a perfect 15–0 record (10–0 against conference opponents), outscored opponents by a total of 533 to 233, and won the GLIAC championship. 

The team advanced to the playoffs and won the national championship by defeating  in the championship game. The championship was the second in a row for Grand Valley and the fourth in five years.

The team played its home games at Lubbers Stadium in Allendale Charter Township, Michigan.

Schedule

References

Grand Valley State
Grand Valley State Lakers football seasons
Great Lakes Intercollegiate Athletic Conference football champion seasons
NCAA Division II Football Champions
College football undefeated seasons
Grand Valley State Lakers football